The 1956 Virginia 500 was a NASCAR Grand National Series event that was held on May 20, 1956, at Martinsville Speedway in Martinsville, Virginia. As the inaugural event for the NASCAR Grand National Series in Martinsville, this race would set a precedent for all other 500-lap races to follow on this newly paved short track.

Background

Martinsville Speedway is one of five short tracks to hold NASCAR races. The track's turns are banked at eleven degrees, while the front stretch, the location of the finish line, is banked at zero degrees. The back stretch also has a zero degree banking.

Race report
The time of the race was four hours and three minutes while there were seven cautions for twenty laps.

Compared to the top speed of today's passenger vehicles which is considered to be  in most makes and models, these stock cars were considered to be slow. Buck Baker defeated Speedy Thompson by half a lap. Other notable drivers who participated in the race included Arden Mounts, Cotton Owens, Fireball Roberts, Tiny Lund, Paul Goldsmith, and Lee Petty. The winning vehicle was a 1956 Dodge Coronet. Thirty-five American drivers dueled each other with no foreign-born competitors either in qualifying or the race itself. It would be the first time that a driver with the number 502 would win a race. Joe Bill O'Dell took quite a spill in this race; with his lap 37 crash causing his vehicle to have all four wheels off the ground.

Most of the stock car owners were independent and had no formal ties to the multi-car teams that would start to form in the 1960s and 1970s. A vehicle made by the Packard Motor Car Company even qualified for the race; eventually finishing in 34th place due to a tire problem. Years later, the Packard Motor Company would be victimized by the "Big Three" automobile manufacturers and would close due to lack of sales.

Shorty Johns and Carl Kiekhaefer were the two most notable crew chiefs to attend this race.

Twenty thousands fans were on hand to watch the race live. The total winnings of the race was $10,275 ($ when considering inflation). Buck Baker received most of the day's earnings with a grand total of $3,100 ($ when considering inflation).

Qualifying
According to the official lineup sheet from the official program, the first 20 cars would qualify based on speed. Then, positions 21-30 would be based on their positions on a 10 lap qualifying race. Positions 31-40, those who would DNQ on Saturday, would be decided on who got to the track first, i.e. the first driver would get 31st, the second would get 32nd, etc. Buck Baker would win the pole with a 27.230.

Timeline
Section reference:
 Start of race: Speedy Thompson started the race with the pole position.
 Lap 8: Piston issues caused Ralph Liguori to become the last-place finisher.
 Lap 25: Jim Rhoades' "road to success" came to a dead end with tire problems.
 Lap 29: Bob Duell had a terminal crash, forcing him out of the race.
 Lap 37: Joe Bill O'Dell had a terminal crash, he was forced to exit the race.
 Lap 69: Tim Flock had a terminal crash, forcing him to exit the race.
 Lap 149: A non-functioning piston crushed Darvin Randahl's hopes of winning the race.
 Lap 156: Transmission issues brought down Ted Cannady.
 Lap 216: Buck Baker took over the lead from Speedy Thompson.
 Lap 222: Herb Thomas takes over the lead from Buck Baker.
 Lap 243: Cotton Owen's race weekend was devastated by a troublesome right front hub.
 Lap 252: Blackie Pitt's vehicle had a faulty right front hub.
 Lap 293: Bearing issues caused Jim Paschal to exit the event early.
 Lap 304: Lug bolt problems ended Don Carr's weekend on the track.
 Lap 338: Speedy Thompson took over the lead from Herb Thomas.
 Lap 356: Pete Stewart's vehicle had a faulty right rear axle.
 Lap 377: Herb Thomas's vehicle had a problematic engine that kept him from finishing the race.
 Lap 382: Buck Baker takes over the lead from Speedy Thompson.
 Lap 436: Bobby Myers developed a faulty right front hub in his vehicle.
 Lap 441: Reitzel Darner developed a faulty right front hub in his vehicle.
 Finish: Buck Baker was officially declared the winner of the event.

Finishing order
Section reference:

† signifies that the driver is known to be deceased 
* Driver failed to finish race

References

Virginia 500
Virginia 500
Virginia 500
NASCAR races at Martinsville Speedway